Pleurocystites (meaning rib bag or side bladder) is a genus of rhombiferan echinoderm (a cystoid) that lived in the Late Ordovician.  Its fossils are known from Europe and North America. Pleurocystites grew to a height of 2 centimeters (3/4 of an inch) and fed on plankton.

Sources
 Fossils (Smithsonian Handbooks) by David Ward (Page 191)
 Parker, Steve. Dinosaurus: the complete guide to dinosaurs. Firefly Books Inc, 2003. Pg. 75

External links
Pleurocystites in the Paleobiology Database

Rhombifera
Ordovician echinoderms of Europe
Ordovician echinoderms of North America
Late Ordovician first appearances
Late Ordovician extinctions
Paleozoic life of Ontario
Paleozoic life of Quebec